The 1968 Arkansas State Indians football team represented Arkansas State University as a member of the Southland Conference during the 1968 NCAA College Division football season. Led by sixth-year head coach Bennie Ellender, the Arkansas State compiled an overall record of 7–3–1 with a mark of 3–0–1 in conference play, winning the Southland title. The Indians were invited to the Pecan Bowl, where they were defeated by North Dakota State.

Schedule

References

Arkansas State
Arkansas State Red Wolves football seasons
Southland Conference football champion seasons
Arkansas State Indians football